Pavel Leonidovich Kogan (Russian: Павел Леонидович Коган; born 6 June 1952 in Moscow) is a Russian violinist and conductor who led the Moscow State Symphony Orchestra from 1989 until 2022.

Maestro Pavel Kogan's career has spanned over 40 years and five continents and has led him to becoming a respected and widely known Russian conductor.

Career
From an early age Kogan’s artistic development was divided between conducting and violin. He was granted special permission to study both disciplines at the same time which was a rarity in the Soviet Union.
In 1970 eighteen-year-old Pavel Kogan, a violin pupil of Yuri Yankelevich at the Moscow Conservatory, shared the 1st prize in the Sibelius Violin Competition in Helsinki with Liana Isakadze. Thereafter he appeared regularly as a violinist in concerts around the world.

In the years that followed he conducted the leading Soviet orchestras both at home and on tour abroad at the invitation of Mravinsky, Kondrashin, Svetlanov and Rozhdestvensky.
In 1988, as a conductor of the Bolshoi Opera, Kogan opened the season with a new production of Verdi’s La Traviata. That same year he became the head of the Zagreb Philharmonic Orchestra.

From 1989 till 2022 Pavel Kogan has been the Music Director and Chief Conductor of the Moscow State Symphony Orchestra (MSSO), building it into one of Russia’s most widely known orchestras.

From 1998-2005 he served as principal guest conductor of the Utah Symphony Orchestra.

Kogan appeared with many prominent orchestras including the St. Petersburg Philharmonic Orchestra, Moscow Philharmonic Orchestra, USSR State Radio & TV Symphony Orchestra, Philadelphia Orchestra, Los Angeles Philharmonic, Bavarian Radio Symphony Orchestra, Munich Philharmonic, Orchestre National de Belgique, Helsinki Philharmonic Orchestra, RTVE Symphony Orchestra, Toronto Symphony Orchestra, Staatskapelle Dresden, Orquesta Filarmónica de Buenos Aires, L'Orchestre de la Suisse Romande, Orchestre National de France, Houston Symphony, Orchestre National du Capitole de Toulouse and the Luxembourg Philharmonic Orchestra.

Pavel Kogan has recorded countless works with the MSSO and other ensembles. Gramophone called Kogan’s Rachmaninoff cycle (Symphonies 1, 2, 3, Symphonic Dances, “Isle of the Dead,” “Vocalize & Scherzo”) “…sparkly, strongly communicative Rachmaninoff... vibrant, soulful and involving.”
Kogan was awarded the State Prize of the Russian Federation for his performance of the complete symphonies and vocal cycles of Gustav Mahler. He is a member of the Russian Academy of Arts and recipient of the “Order of Merit” of Russia and of the title “Peoples’ Artist of Russia” among other Russian and overseas awards.

Personal life
Kogan's wife is Aistė Kogan. His son was violinist Dmitri Kogan.

Kogan was born into a distinguished musical family – his parents are violinists Leonid Kogan and Elizaveta Gilels and his uncle is the pianist Emil Gilels.

Recordings
As violinist:
 Haydn Concerto No. 1 for Violin and Orchestra. Mozart: Concerto No. 5 for Violin and Orchestra in A Major KV219. Melodiya, LP.
 Rachmaninov: Symphony No. 3; Symphonic Dances. Moscow State Symphony Orchestra. Alto. CD.

References

1952 births
Living people
Russian violinists
Russian Jews
Male violinists
Moscow Conservatory alumni
21st-century Russian conductors (music)
Russian male conductors (music)
21st-century Russian male musicians
21st-century violinists